Boonyarit Phuksachat (born 25 August 1978) is a Thai sprinter. He competed in the men's 4 × 100 metres relay at the 2000 Summer Olympics.

References

1978 births
Living people
Athletes (track and field) at the 2000 Summer Olympics
Boonyarit Phuksachat
Boonyarit Phuksachat
Place of birth missing (living people)
Athletes (track and field) at the 1998 Asian Games
Athletes (track and field) at the 2002 Asian Games
Boonyarit Phuksachat
Boonyarit Phuksachat